The following highways are numbered 30A:

India
  National Highway 30A (India)

United States
 U.S. Route 30A (former)
 New England Interstate Route 30A (former)
 Florida State Road 30A
 County Road 30A (Walton County, Florida)
 New York State Route 30A